Ardisia scheryi is a species of plant in the family Primulaceae. It is endemic to Panama.  It is threatened by habitat loss.

References

Flora of Panama
scheryi
Endangered plants
Taxonomy articles created by Polbot